Wheston is a village and civil parish in the Derbyshire Peak District. Notable features include Wheston Hall and the Wheston Cross. It probably dates from the 14th century and marked the way from Tideswell to Buxton along the Forest Road. Images of the Madonna and Child and the Crucifixion are carved into it. The cross is both a scheduled monument and a Grade II* listed building.

The village was formerly known as Whestone.

References

External links

Towns and villages of the Peak District
Villages in Derbyshire
Derbyshire Dales